Victorio Blanco (1893–1977) was a Mexican film actor. He enjoyed a lengthy and prolific career, appearing in around three hundred films.

Selected filmography
 Judas (1936)
 The Midnight Ghost (1940)
 Simón Bolívar (1942)
 The Magician (1949)
 Another Spring (1950)
 The Doorman (1950)
 Cabaret Shangai (1950)
 The Two Orphans (1950)
 Aventurera (1950)
 Traces of the Past (1950)
 Los Olvidados (1950)
 Love for Sale (1951)
 Serenade in Acapulco (1951)
 They Say I'm a Communist (1951)
 María Montecristo (1951)
 Women Without Tomorrow (1951)
 The Masked Tiger (1951)
 Los enredos de una gallega (1951)
 Kill Me Because I'm Dying! (1951)
 My Darling Clementine (1953)
 The Player (1953)
 A Tailored Gentleman (1954)
 Tehuantepec (1954)
 The Sin of Being a Woman (1955)
 The Bandits of Cold River (1956)

References

Bibliography
 Emilio García Riera. Historia documental del cine mexicano: 1929-1937. Universidad de Guadalajara, 1992.

External links

1893 births
1977 deaths
Mexican male film actors
Male actors from Veracruz
20th-century Mexican male actors
People from Alvarado, Veracruz